Lawrence Hubert Hill, Jr. (born January 25, 1958, in Montgomery, Alabama) is an American football coach and former player. He is currently the defensive line coach for the Helvetic Guards in the European League of Football.

Early life and playing career
Hill started playing football as a first grader in the local YMCA league. He later played as a linebacker for the Sidney Lanier High School where he graduated in 1976. His collegiate career started at Marion Military Institute, before transferring to Wichita State University and finished out his playing career in 1978.

Coaching career
Hill started his coaching career in 1979 as defensive coordinator at Cloverdale Junior High in his hometown Montgomery, Alabama.

College football
His first station as a coach led Hill to the Texas A&M football program, where he coached players like Jeroy Robinson. While he was on the staff, the Aggies won three straight Southwest Conference titles (1985-87).
After the 86/87 season, Hill had a one-year stint with the Ohio State football program in 88. For the 89 season, he came back to the Aggies to finish with a 8–4 record and a No. 20 ranking overall.

In 2008 he was hired as the DL coach for the SMU Mustang football program under June Jones. There he had numerous achievements and successful seasons with the Mustangs, having four consecutive bowl seasons and multiple bowl wins. He also helped in recruiting and training efforts for Margus Hunt and Taylor Thompson.

Detroit Lions
Hill joined the Lions as the team's strength and conditioning coach in 1990 under Wayne Fontes. He has held this position for over a decade, working with the team to improve the strength, speed, and overall physical condition of its players. In 1998 he also began to coach the offensive line as an assistant, where he previously coached the defensive line too.

Miami Dolphins
After a break from coaching, Hill was hired as the strength and conditioning coach for the Miami Dolphins in 2005. In his time till 2007, the Dolphins had a record of 16–32. Following his engagement with the Dolphins, he coached college football teams again.

Helvetic Guards
In August 2022, Chow was named the first head coach of the Helvetic Guards ahead of their first season in the European League of Football.

Other professional teams
In 2018 he coached in the Canadian football team Montreal Alouettes and in 2020 the Tampa Bay Vipers of the XFL, both in the function as a defensive line coach.

Personal life
Hill is the second of three children of Lawrence and Marietta Hill. Hill received his bachelor's degree in physical education from Auburn University at Montgomery and a Master's of Science degree in exercise science with an emphasis in strength physiology from Auburn University. Between his time as coach at the Lions and Dolphins he was Director of Endorsements at AdvoCare.

He is also the author of a publication for football specific training.

Written works
 Conditioning: How to Get in Football Shape (2003) –

References

1958 births
Living people
Sports coaches from Alabama
Texas A&M Aggies coaches
Ohio State Buckeyes football coaches
Detroit Lions coaches
Miami Dolphins coaches
American expatriate sportspeople in Switzerland
European League of Football coaches